The Nharhweni River (meaning "stony river") is located in eastern Limpopo, South Africa.

Tributaries include the Ngwenyeni River, Nwanedzi River and Makhadzi River.

References

Rivers of Limpopo